Bernard Revilla Palanca Jr. (born December 3, 1976) is a Filipino host, film/television character actor, and product endorser.

Early life
His maternal grandfather, Armando Goyena (real name: José Revilla), was an actor as was his younger brother, Miko Palanca. He is the son of Bernard Palanca Sr., a race car driver, who died when Bernard Jr. was just a child. On his father's side of the family, he is a grandson of businessman and philanthropist Carlos Palanca Jr. of the family that organizes the Carlos Palanca Memorial Awards for Literature. His mother, Pita Revilla-Palanca (later Revilla-Hocson) came from the Revilla clan of celebrities (not to be confused with the Bautista clan who are more popularly known as Revillas). Among his aunts are former actress/Camay model/jewelry designer Maritess Revilla-Araneta, Cita Revilla-Yabut who was also a Camay model, as well as actress and TV host Tina Revilla-Valencia. Bianca Araneta-Elizalde, a model and social entrepreneur and daughter of Marites is his cousin. Another showbiz relation is actor-host-businessman Johnny Revilla, the only brother of Bernard's mother, married to singer Janet Basco. Palanca is known to be a versatile actor and has worked with all the famous actors and actresses in Philippine cinema.  He has Chinese ancestry from his father's side.

Career
A member of ABS-CBN's Star Magic stable, Palanca was part of "The Hunks" together with Piolo Pascual, Jericho Rosales, Diether Ocampo, and Carlos Agassi and the defunct band Bizkit Factory that was featured in the movie Kahit Isang Saglit.  He is a Star Magic Batch 5 alumni. Palanca also had hosting stint in the Philippine local music television channel myx on its myx Live! program.

Palanca was also once an endorser for San Miguel Beer Pale Pilsen and currently for Beer na Beer.

Network switches
Palanca was a member of ABS-CBN Star Magic talents but he did not renew his contract after the expiration. He decided to fuse on GMA Network and became one of the cast of primetime series Gagambino where he worked with Dennis Trillo, Katrina Halili and Ryza Cenon. After Gagambino, Palanca appeared again in the afternoon hit drama series co-starred with  Heart Evangelista and JC de Vera in the remake of Ngayon at Kailanman aired on GMA Network.

Palanca also had a short role on Philippine remake of Rosalinda. He had a guesting role on GMA's rival station ABS-CBN via May Bukas Pa for a short stint. He was a regular cast member on GMA's fantasy series called Panday Kids but the management allowed him to have some roles on their rival station ABS-CBN's program Rosalka top-billed by Empress Schuck as well.

He was once part of GMA Network's Philippine remake of Koreanovela Autumn in My Heart - Endless Love and as of 2013, he was back on his home network ABS-CBN. Palanca played Diego Buenavista in the 2015 remake of Pangako Sa 'Yo, a role originally played by Jestoni Alarcon.

In Feb 2020, he returned to GMA-7 as part of the upcoming cultural drama, Legal Wives. He did a 2-episode arc titled Positive as Greg in the GMA drama anthology, Tadhana, during 2019 before playing Gary Salvacion on ABS-CBN's fantasy-sci-fi-horror-drama miniserye, Parasite Island.

Personal life
Palanca has been open about his past drug addiction and admitted he went into rehabilitation during his showbiz hiatus. He was also known for his long-term relationship with actress Rica Peralejo whom he dated from late 2000-2003.  He was once married to actress Meryll Soriano, the eldest daughter of host Willie Revillame.

On August 27, 2007, Soriano gave birth to their son, Elijah Pineda (6.5 lbs, 10:01 a.m.) at Makati Medical Center. Her mother, Bec-Bec Soriano, rushed her to hospital, while Palanca and his mother Pita arrived later. 

After Palanca and Soriano separated, Palanca dated Jerika Ejercito, daughter of former President and Mayor of Manila Joseph Ejercito Estrada. Jerika gave birth to a baby boy whom they named Isaiah Joseph E. Palanca on May 7, 2014. Palanca and Ejercito are on good terms with Palanca's former wife, Soriano.

Palanca separated from Ejercito in 2016 and is now in a relationship since with Tracey Tabora, a fashion designer and professor, a year later.

Palanca's younger brother and actor Miko died in December 2019 due to apparent suicide. Three months later, in March 19, 2020, his mother Pita Revilla-Hocson died due to cancer.

Filmography

Film

Television/Digital

References

External links

1976 births
Living people
Filipino male film actors
Filipino male television actors
Filipino people of Chinese descent
Star Magic
Place of birth missing (living people)
VJs (media personalities)
Filipino male comedians
ABS-CBN personalities
GMA Network personalities
20th-century Filipino male actors
21st-century Filipino male actors